Philip Michael Lester (born 30 January 1987) is an English YouTuber and radio host. He is best known for his YouTube channels AmazingPhil, which gained over 4 million subscribers, and DanAndPhilGAMES. Together with frequent collaborator Daniel Howell, he presented the Sunday night entertainment show Dan and Phil on BBC Radio 1 from January 2013 until August 2014, and from September 2014 to April 2016 the duo were monthly hosts on the station's The Internet Takeover slot.

Lester appeared on The Sunday Times’ 2019 list of the top influencers in the UK.

Early life
Lester was born on 30 January 1987 in Rawtenstall, Lancashire. He has an older brother, Martyn. Before he made vlogs and radio presenting his full-time profession, he was a dog walker and car washer, worked at a veterinary clinic and at WHSmith, and had an acting role as Tim in Faintheart. He attended Bacup and Rawtenstall Grammar School. He later graduated with a Bachelor of Arts with Honours in English Language and Linguistics in 2008 and a Master of Arts in Video Postproduction with Visual Effects in 2009, both from the University of York.

Career

YouTube 

At age 19 on 27 March 2006, Lester posted his first YouTube vlog titled "Phil's Video Blog" on his main YouTube channel, AmazingPhil. Since then he has posted over 300 videos on his channel and, as of September 2022, has over 3.9 million subscribers and 659 million video views. He reached 1 million YouTube subscribers on 6 July 2013, 2 million on 29 August 2014, 3 million on 12 October 2015, and 4 million on 14 March 2017.

Lester also has a second channel, LessAmazingPhil, which has over 1 million subscribers and 26 million views, as of September 2022. He occasionally broadcast hour-long live shows on this channel, as well as YouNow livestreams, but has since used the channel to archive his more recent streams.

From 2009 to 2011, Lester participated in RTÉ's Ireland-based cross-media show, ApartmentRed.

In 2010, Lester and Howell took part in the live, annual 24-hour internet broadcast "Stickaid", a fundraiser for charity UNICEF.

In 2011, Lester and Howell created a collaborative YouTube channel through the network My Damn Channel. Titled The Super Amazing Project, it featured the duo discussing and investigating paranormal events. Segments included "Viewers Spooky Happenings", where the audience of the show would send in "scary" items for the video bloggers to react to, and "In The News This Week", where the duo recapped recent light-hearted news items and viral videos. In October 2014, it was announced that as of that month Lester and Howell would not carry on working on The Super Amazing Project in order to concentrate on their Radio 1 show. Lester and Howell later announced that the Super Amazing Project would be hosted by new presenters, Alastair James Murder and Victoria Atkin, found by channel owners My Damn Channel.

Lester has also appeared alongside Howell in Benjamin Cook's twelve part web series Becoming YouTube, and was interviewed on the various topics Cook covered.

On 12 September 2014, Howell and Lester posted the first video on their new gaming YouTube channel, DanAndPhilGAMES. On 8 March 2015 the channel hit 1 million subscribers. It was officially the fastest growing channel on YouTube. DanAndPhilGAMES reached over 3.1 million subscribers. Popular recurring and annual series on this channel include their Sims 4 series, Spooky Week, and Gamingmas. As of the most recent upload in December 2018, the channel is on an indefinite hiatus.

On 1 April 2015, Lester and Howell launched a spin-off crafts-based channel, DanAndPhilCRAFTS, as an April Fools joke. It featured a single video of them creating square snowflakes out of paper, with an amateur editing style and humour throughout. It reached over 154,000 subscribers and 500,000 total video views in one week. Additional videos were uploaded on April Fool's Day in 2016 and 2017.

Television and film
In 2007, Lester appeared as a contestant on The Weakest Link, making it to the final round. He also played the role of Tim in 2008 film Faintheart and appeared in a Confused.com advertisement later that year. At the time of making the advert, he had around 27,000 subscribers.

Lester was interviewed with other internet entertainers on Channel 4 News in October 2012 about the increased popularity of YouTube and video blogging as a profession.

In 2013 Lester and Howell appeared on Friday Download, a BAFTA award-winning CBBC TV show.

From 2014 to 2016 Howell and Lester hosted the worldwide YouTube livestream of the Brit Awards as well as making backstage videos for their channel.

In 2015, Lester and Howell had voice cameo appearances in the UK cinema release of Walt Disney Animation Studios' Big Hero 6 as Technician 1 & 2.  However, this version is not in the UK home release. That same year, the duo also guest-starred in fellow YouTuber PJ Liguori's online series Oscar's Hotel for Fantastical Creatures, voicing anthropomorphic food items Brie and Rash.

In December 2016, Howell and Lester voiced two gorilla princes named Majinuni and Hafifu respectively, in the episode "The Lost Gorillas" in Disney Junior's The Lion Guard.

Radio 

In November 2012, the BBC announced that from January 2013 onwards, Lester and Howell would present the Sunday night entertainment and request show for national UK radio station BBC Radio 1. The duo had occasionally worked with Radio 1 before, making videos for the station's YouTube channel and presenting two Christmas broadcasts.

The show was designed to be an interactive, audio-visual broadcast involving music videos made by viewers, physical challenges performed on air by Howell and Lester, and song requests from listeners. It was streamed in a video, live on the BBC Radio 1 website, and accessible worldwide.

In August 2014, it was announced that the last Dan and Phil show would be broadcast on 24 August, with the duo moving to a different show on Monday nights, featuring other popular video bloggers. This new show was titled The Internet Takeover, and featured Lester alongside Howell live on the first Monday of every month, before coming to an end in April 2016.

IRL Merch
In 2014, Lester, Lester's brother, Martyn, and Howell co-founded IRL Digital, Ltd., a company that creates and sells the merchandise of various other media personalities, starting with Dan and Phil Shop and branching out from there.

Games
In August 2015, Howell and Lester created an app, The 7 Second Challenge, based on a YouTube challenge started by Lester in a 2014 video on his main channel. The app was discontinued in 2019. In October 2017, the duo released a party board game via Big Potato, Truth Bombs, also the brainchild of Lester.

The Amazing Book Is Not on Fire and The Amazing Tour Is Not on Fire
On 26 March 2015, Lester and Howell announced via a trailer on Howell's channel that they had co-written a book titled The Amazing Book Is Not on Fire (TABINOF). It was released in the UK on 8 October 2015 and worldwide on 15 October 2015, published by Ebury Press and Random House Children's Books. The book topped the General Hardbacks Sunday Times Bestsellers list having sold 26,745 copies in the UK in the first week of its release. It also became a #1 New York Times Bestseller in the young adult hardcover list.

In the same trailer the pair announced their theatrical stage show The Amazing Tour Is Not On Fire (TATINOF), which travelled around the UK during October and November 2015, ending with a show at the London Palladium. During the tour, they sung original song "The Internet Is Here", which they later released as a charity single for Stand Up To Cancer, earning them a gold record disc for the sales of the song.

In 2016, they took the tour to the US and Toronto, starting with a show in Orlando, Florida on 22 April and ended on 24 June with a show at the Dolby Theatre in Hollywood, California. It was the largest tour ever achieved by YouTube creators. They later toured Australia in August 2016, starting in Perth and ending in Brisbane, and finished the tour with a European leg, performing in Stockholm, Berlin, and Dublin.

YouTube Red Originals and Dan and Phil Go Outside 
In October 2016, The Amazing Tour Is Not on Fire was released as a YouTube Red Original film by the same name along with a documentary, Dan and Phil's Story of TATINOF. They are the first British YouTube creators to release content on the YouTube Red platform.

Alongside these films, they released a photo book, Dan and Phil Go Outside, in November 2016, which includes a personal collection of candid photos and insightful stories from the tour. The book became a #1 New York Times bestseller.

Interactive Introverts 
In November 2017, Lester and Howell announced their second tour, Interactive Introverts, a world tour that took place in 2018. The tour ran from April, starting in Brighton, to September, ending in Mumbai, and included 80 shows in 18 countries, including but not limited to Poland, the Philippines, Russia, New Zealand, Finland, and the Netherlands, making it one of the biggest YouTuber tours of all time.

Lester and Howell partnered with BBC Studios' TalentWorks to release a movie of Interactive Introverts with bonus features, such as behind the scenes content and director's commentary, on DVD, Blu-ray, and available for digital download in December 2018.

Personal life
Lester and Daniel Howell met on the Internet in 2009 and in person that October. They have lived together since August 2011, first in Manchester before moving to London in July 2012. In June 2019, Howell revealed that the two have been romantically involved but refrained from discussing their current relationship, stating "I'm somebody that wants to keep the details of my personal life private. So is Phil." On the same day, Lester tweeted about his own sexuality. Two and a half weeks later, Lester publicly came out as gay in a video on his channel, although he had been open about it in his personal life since university.

Bibliography
The Amazing Book Is Not on Fire (2015), co-written with Daniel Howell
Dan and Phil Go Outside (2016), co-written with Daniel Howell

Awards and nominations
In 2011, Lester won a Guinness World Record for fastest coin stacking, placing 25 coins on top of each other in 31.617 seconds.

See also
Dan and Phil

Notes

References

External links

The Internet Takeover on BBC

1987 births
Alumni of the University of York
BBC Radio 1 presenters
Dan and Phil
English company founders
English radio DJs
English video bloggers
English YouTubers
Gaming YouTubers
Gay entertainers
English LGBT entertainers
LGBT YouTubers
Living people
People educated at Bacup and Rawtenstall Grammar School
People from Bury, Greater Manchester
People from Rawtenstall
20th-century LGBT people
21st-century LGBT people